Gam Point is a rocky point  southeast of False Round Point on the north coast of King George Island, in the South Shetland Islands. The point is one of the features named Pyritic or Esther Islands by Scottish geologist David Ferguson in 1913–14. It was named by the UK Antarctic Place-Names Committee in 1960. The word "gam" is an old sealers' and whalers' term for the occasions when groups of men from several vessels met in one of them for a gossip. Nearby Esther Harbour was an anchorage frequently used by sealers.

References

Headlands of King George Island (South Shetland Islands)